The First Baptist Church is a historic church building in Red Cloud, Nebraska. It was built in 1884 thanks to the American Baptist Home Mission Society. Author Willa Cather grew up attending this church with her parents, and she wrote about it in her 1915 novel, The Song of the Lark. It has been listed on the National Register of Historic Places since August 12, 1982.

References

National Register of Historic Places in Webster County, Nebraska
Baptist churches in Nebraska
Churches completed in 1883
Willa Cather